The Third Merkel cabinet (German: Kabinett Merkel III) was the 23rd Government of the Federal Republic of Germany during the 18th legislative session of the Bundestag. Installed after the 2013 federal election, it left office on 14 March 2018. It was preceded by the second Merkel cabinet and succeeded by the fourth Merkel cabinet. Led by Chancellor Angela Merkel. The government was supported by a coalition of the Christian Democratic Union (CDU), the Christian Social Union of Bavaria (CSU) and the Social Democrats (SPD). Sigmar Gabriel (SPD) replaced Philipp Rösler (FDP) as Vice Chancellor of Germany and became Federal Minister for Economics and Energy.

The CDU received five ministries in addition to the positions of Chancellor, as well as Chancellery Chief of Staff and Minister for Special Affairs. The SPD controlled six ministries and the CSU three. Although the CSU received a disproportionate share of ministries relative to its weight in the Bundestag, the six most powerful ministries were divided equally between the CDU and the SPD: the CDU controls the ministries for finance, internal affairs and defense, while the SPD controls the ministries for foreign affairs, economics and energy, as well as justice and consumer protection.

The term of office of the third Merkel cabinet officially ended with the constitution of the 19th Bundestag on Tuesday, 24 October 2017. Merkel and her cabinet ministers received their discharge papers from the Federal President Frank-Walter Steinmeier on the same day. In accordance with Article 69 of the German Constitution and at the request of the President of Germany, the cabinet remained in office as the caretaker government until a new government is formed.

Composition

|}

Caretaker government following the 2017 election
After the German federal election held on Sunday, 24 September 2017, SPD leader Martin Schulz declared that the SPD had decided to be a part of the opposition during the next legislation period. However, after coalition talks between the Union (CDU/CSU), FDP and the Greens failed, SPD politicians reconsidered, leading to coalition negotiations between the CDU/CSU and the SPD. On 8 February 2018, the negotiations resulted in a provisional agreement to form a grand coalition, which was approved by the party members of the SPD and led to the formation of the new government on 14 March 2018.

References

External links
Cabinet of Germany (English)
Federal Ministries of Germany (English)

Meklel III
Merkel III
2013 establishments in Germany
Merkel III
Angela Merkel
Grand coalition governments